Pierre Hanot (born 25 March 1952, Metz) is a French novelist, visual artist and musician.

Biography 
Hanot has performed over 1000 concerts, including more than 200 in most French prisons. He reported this experience in his first work, Rock'n taules published in 2005. Five of his novels have already been published including the thriller Les Clous du fakir, which was awarded the 2009 prix Erckmann-Chatrian.

Books 
2005: Rock'n Taules (narrative, éd. Le bord de l'eau) : Testimony and reflection on the experience of his concerts in prisons.
2006: Les Hommes sont des icebergs (novel, éd. Le bord de l'eau) : And if alcohol was banned in France?
2007: Serial Loser (Polar, éd. Mare Nostrum -collection Polar Rock) 
2009: Les clous du fakir (novel, Fayard Noir) 
2012: Aux armes défuntes (novel, éd. Baleine): Novel of the inversion of values, burlesque tale oscillating between military equipment, ubuesque farce and parody of SF.
2012: Le couteau des mots (short story): short story in "Aux portes du noir", collective work devoted to The Doors. 
2012: Tout du tatou: (Polar, Éditions La Branche, series "vendredi 13")

Discography 
1985: Rock dérive 
1995: En un instant damnés 
1996: Mosquée bleue 
1997: On n’est pas des chiens 
2000: Vu à la télé

References

External links 
Pierre Hanot, Tout du tatou
on Bord de l'eau
Official website

21st-century French non-fiction writers
French rock guitarists
French male guitarists
French rock singers
Writers from Metz
1952 births
Living people
Musicians from Metz